The women's team soft tennis event was part of the soft tennis programme and took place between October 1 and 3, at the Sajik Tennis Courts.

Schedule
All times are Korea Standard Time (UTC+09:00)

Results

References 

2002 Asian Games Reports, Page 699
Official website

External links 
Results

Soft tennis at the 2002 Asian Games